Shut Up and Dance may refer to:
 Shut Up and Dance (duo), an English dance music duo
 Shut Up and Dance (Kelsey gilbert album) or the title song, 2012
 Shut Up and Dance: Mixes, an album by Paula Abdul, 1990
 "Shut Up and Dance" (Aerosmith song), 1994
 "Shut Up and Dance" (Walk the Moon song), 2014
 "Shut Up and Dance", a song by Pearl Harbor and the Explosions from Pearl Harbor and the Explosions, 1980
 "Shut Up and Dance", a song by the Pointer Sisters from their  Serious Slammin' album
 "Shut Up and Dance", a song by Victorious cast from Victorious 2.0: More Music from the Hit TV Show, 2012
"Shut Up and Dance", a song by Better Than Ezra from All Together Now, 2014
 "Shut Up and Dance" (Black Mirror), a television episode